The 1898 Chicago Maroons football team represented the University of Chicago during the 1898 Western Conference football season.

Schedule

Roster

Head coach: Amos Alonzo Stagg (7th year at Chicago)

References

Chicago
Chicago Maroons football seasons
Chicago Maroons football